Arthur Li Kwok-cheung, GBM, GBS JP (born 27 June 1945) is a Hong Kong doctor and politician. He is currently member of the Executive Council of the Hong Kong Special Administrative Region and the chairman of the Council of the University of Hong Kong (HKU). He was Vice-Chancellor of the Chinese University of Hong Kong (CUHK) from 1996 to 2002 and Secretary for Education and Manpower from 2002 to 2007. Li’s dictatorial and ruthless leadership style led some to refer to him as "King Arthur" and even "the Tsar". He is the grandson of the co-founder of the Bank of East Asia, Li Koon-chun, and brother of its current chairman, David Li. He was awarded the Grand Bauhinia Medal (GBM) by the Hong Kong SAR Government in 2017.

Life and career
Li was born into the prominent Li family. His grandfather, Li Koon-chun, was the founder of the Bank of East Asia. His father, Li Fook-shu, was the unofficial member of the Executive Council and Legislative Council. His brother, David Li Kwok-po, succeeded his father to become the chairman of the Bank of East Asia and member of the Legislative Council.

An alumnus of St. Paul's Co-educational College and a classmate of Professor Lawrence J. Lau, Li received his medical training at the University of Cambridge. He was subsequently trained at Middlesex Hospital Medical School and Harvard Medical School, before returning to Hong Kong to become the founding chairman of the Department of Surgery and Dean of the Faculty of Medicine at the Chinese University of Hong Kong. 

Li's tenure as Secretary for Education and Manpower was marked by an era of education reforms that included the School-Based Management Policy. Since 2000, the Education and Manpower Bureau has implemented a number of mandates, including having teachers spend more time with students outside the classroom, adding exams for subjects such as English and history, and ordering that teachers take benchmark assessments to prove their language abilities. Li ostensibly retired from public service in 2007.

In the role, he caused controversy by proposing mergers first between Chinese University and Hong Kong University of Science and Technology, and later between Chinese University and the Hong Kong Institute of Education.

Li's appointment by CY Leung to the governing board of the University of Hong Kong in 2015 has been met with strong criticism, particularly from academic staff (mostly pro-democrats): a poll has shown most to have little to no confidence that Li will uphold academic freedom. Further, Li's general attitude towards staff has been said to be 'hostile' and 'critical'.

Six months later, when it became known that Li was likely to take over the chairmanship of the Council upon the expiry of the term of Edward Leong on 6 November, there was further strong opposition, with 87 percent of members of HKU Academic Staff Association and almost three-quarters of members of the Professional Teachers Union opposed, due to his stance during the University of Hong Kong pro-vice-chancellor selection controversy.

In December 2018, Li was reappointed for a second three-year term to the Council. His reappointment elicited criticism from the Hong Kong University Students' Union. Academic Staff Association chairman William Cheung Sing-wai expressed that "there has been a chilling effect" during Li's tenure.

In December 2021, Li criticized Hong Kong's Pillar of Shame, calling it a lie and claiming it was not built to honour those killed in the 1989 Tiananmen Square massacre.

Reputation 
His leadership style has seen him being referred to as "King Arthur" or even "the Tsar".

Personal life 
He was married to Diana Chester, a registered nurse and graduate of New Hall College, Cambridge University who died in 2013. 

Li owns more than 40 properties.

Appointments
Before his appointment, Li was Vice-Chancellor of the Chinese University of Hong Kong (CUHK), as well as:
 Professor of Surgery and Dean of the Faculty of Medicine, CUHK
 Member of the Education Commission and Member of the Committee on Science and Technology
 Member of the Hong Kong Hospital Authority
 Member of the Hong Kong Medical Council
 Member of the University Grants Committee
 Member of the College of Surgeons of Hong Kong
 Member of the Hospital Governing Committee of United Christian Hospital, Kwun Tong, Hong Kong
 Member of the board of directors of the Hong Kong Science and Technology Parks Corporation
 Member of the Hong Kong Applied Science and Technology Research Institute
 Vice-President of the Association of University presidents of China
 Patron of the Royal College of Surgeons of Great Britain and Ireland
 Regent of the Royal College of Surgeons of Edinburgh
 Honorary Fellow of the American Surgical Association
 Hon Fellow of the America College of Surgeons
 Hon Fellow of the Royal College of Surgeons of Ireland and Glasgow
 Hon Fellow of the Royal Society of Medicine

See also
 Politics of Hong Kong
 Executive Council of Hong Kong
 Four big families of Hong Kong
 School-Based Management Policy
 University of Hong Kong pro-vice-chancellor selection controversy

References

External links
 Arthur Li profile at Hong Kong Government website (archive)

1945 births
Living people
Academic staff of the Chinese University of Hong Kong
Alumni of King's College, Cambridge
Government officials of Hong Kong
Harvard Medical School alumni
Hong Kong medical doctors
Members of the National Committee of the Chinese People's Political Consultative Conference
Medical educators
Members of the Executive Council of Hong Kong
Vice-Chancellors of the Chinese University of Hong Kong
Recipients of the Grand Bauhinia Medal
Recipients of the Gold Bauhinia Star
Members of the Preparatory Committee for the Hong Kong Special Administrative Region
Members of the Selection Committee of Hong Kong
Members of the Election Committee of Hong Kong, 1998–2000
Members of the Election Committee of Hong Kong, 2000–2005
Members of the Election Committee of Hong Kong, 2012–2017
Members of the Election Committee of Hong Kong, 2021–2026
Hong Kong Basic Law Consultative Committee members
New Hong Kong Alliance politicians
Alumni of St. Paul's Co-educational College
Li family of Hong Kong
Hong Kong justices of the peace